Justice Anane (born 30 December 1994) is a Ghanaian professional footballer who plays as a defender for Ghanaian Premier League side Legon Cities. He previously playing for Dormaa-based team Aduana Stars and Berekum Chelsea.

Career

Berekum Chelsea 
Anane started his career with Berekum Chelsea in 2015. He made his debut on 5 March 2015, playing the full 90 minutes in a goalless draw against Ashanti Gold. He became a standout player as he played 25 league matches in the 2016 season and playing all 30 league matches and scoring a goal during the 2017 league season.

Aduana Stars 
Anane joined Aduana Stars in September 2017 after an impressive season with rivals Berekum Chelsea in 2017. He played for the Dormaa-club till December 2020, in the process winning the Ghana Super League in 2018.

Legon Cities 
After leaving Aduana Stars due to the expiration of his contract, he started training with Accra-based team Legon Cities in January 2021 subject to signing a contract with the club based on his performance. In March 2020, after his trails with the club, he signed two-year deal during the second round of the transfer season as the club sought to boost their squad in their fight for survival in the league. He made his debut on 21 February 2021, playing the full time of 1–1 draw against Bechem United.

Honours

Club 
Aduana Stars

 Ghana Super Cup: 2018

References

External links 
 
 
 
 

1994 births
Living people
Association football defenders
Ghanaian footballers
Berekum Chelsea F.C. players
Aduana Stars F.C. players
Ghana Premier League players